Henry Tiole Ole Ndiema (born 1954) is a Kenyan politician. He was the senator representing Trans-Nzoia County in the Senate of Kenya between 2013 - 2017. He is a member of the Ford Kenya and a coalition member of NASA . He was elected to office at the 2013 Kenya general elections.

References 

1954 births
Living people
United Republican Party (Kenya) politicians
Members of the Senate of Kenya